Drumlane Sons of O’Connell is a Gaelic football club based in Milltown, County Cavan, Ireland. The club takes its name from the parish of Drumlane. The club's crest features the Drumlane Abbey and Round tower.

History

Drumlane GAA was founded in 1888, and won the Cavan Senior Football Championship four times in the early 1900s.

The club won the Cavan Junior Football Championship for the first time in 1948, and won it again in 1971 and 1999. They have never won the Cavan Intermediate Football Championship, losing finals in 1974 and 2010. The club claimed the Junior championship for the fourth time in 2018, defeating Killinkere after a replay.

Drumlane won the Junior title for the fifth time in 2022, beating Arva by a point in the final. Wins over Craigbane, Clones, and Newtownbutler sent the club into the final of the Ulster Junior Club Football Championship for the first time in their history. Drumlane lost the final in a penalty shoot-out to Stewartstown Harps.

Honours
Men's Football
Cavan Senior Football Championship: 4
1903, 1904, 1905, 1907
Cavan Junior Football Championship: 5
1948, 1971, 1999, 2018, 2022
Cavan Minor Football Championship: 2
1972, 1973

Ladies' Football
Cavan Ladies Intermediate Football Championship: 1
2020
Cavan Ladies Junior Football Championship: 1
2011

Notable players
 Frankie Kennedy

References

External links
 Drumlane GAA Official Website
 Drumlane Community Website

Gaelic games clubs in County Cavan
Gaelic football clubs in County Cavan